The Ilhéu de Curral Velho and adjacent coast Important Bird Area lies in the southeastern part of the island of Boa Vista in the Cape Verde archipelago off the coast of north-west Africa in the Atlantic Ocean. It is a 986 ha site consisting of the Ilhéu de Curral Velho, as well as the area opposite it on Boa Vista centred on the deserted village of Curral Velho. It was designated as a Ramsar wetland of international importance on July 18, 2005.

The island and a 41 ha marine area around it are a protected nature reserve (Reserva Natural Integral Ilhéu de Curral Velho). 

The area on the main island consists of sand-dunes, a lagoon and an oasis with a vegetation dominated by palm trees, acacias and Tamarix senegalensis. It has a typical arid-zone flora and fauna. The sandy beaches are important nesting sites for threatened Hawksbill and Loggerhead sea turtles. Lizards found in the area include Chioninia stangeri and Hemidactylus bouvieri. The islet is a nesting area for the brown booby, magnificent frigatebird and Cape Verde shearwater. Birds breeding on the adjacent mainland coast include Iago sparrow, common kestrel, common quail, cream-colored courser, Kentish plover and many other species.

See also
List of islands of Cape Verde

References

Important Bird Areas of Cape Verde
Geography of Boa Vista, Cape Verde
Islands of Cape Verde
Ramsar sites in Cape Verde